Linda Gaye Scott (born February 1, 1943 in Los Angeles, California) is an American actress.

Music career

In 1963, Linda Gaye Scott appeared on the cover of Jan and Dean's second album "Jan and Dean Take Linda Surfin'." Another photo from the same session was used for their "Surf City" 45 picture sleeve. The following year she made her own record, "Joey's Last Big Game" b/w "The Spark that Flamed The Fire" for Apogee Records. (The single did not chart.)

Discography

Singles 

 1964: "Joey's Last Big Game" b/w "The Spark that Flamed The Fire" (Apogee Records A-1-2) mono

Television Career

Linda became a fixture on television in the 1960s and 1970s, appearing in numerous TV series, including Batman, The Green Hornet, Bonanza, Gidget, The Man from U.N.C.L.E., Lost in Space, Love American Style, Columbo, etc.

She was cast as a beautifully charming model, Buffy Baker, in a Bewitched episode entitled, "Three Wishes", that aired on February 9, 1967.

Filmography

Cinema 
1965: Run Home Slow (by Ted Brenner) as Julie Ann Hagen
1968: The Party (by Blake Edwards) as Starlet
1968: Psych-Out (by Richard Rush) as Lynn
1970: Little Fauss and Big Halsy (by Sidney J. Furie) as Moneth
1972: Hammersmith Is Out (by Peter Ustinov) as Miss Quim
1973: Westworld (by Michael Crichton) as Arlette

Television

Television series 
1965: My Living Doll: The Lie (Season 1 Episode 19): Monica Bird
1965: My Favorite Martian: Bottled Martian (Season 3 Episode 8): Nadja
1965: Ben Casey: The Importance of Being 65937 (Season 5 Episode 10): Dora McFadden
1965: Gidget: The War Between Men, Women and Gidget (season 1 episode 13): Patty Cromwell
1965: The Donna Reed Show: How to Handle a Woman (season 8 episode 16): Deborah
1965: The Man from U.N.C.L.E: The Very Important Zombie Affair (Season 2 Episode 15): Suzy
1966: Mister Roberts: The World's Greatest Lover (Season 1 Episode 19)
1966: Batman: The wax ring (The Ring of Wax) (season 1 episode 23): Moth
1966: Batman: The Torture Chamber (Give 'Em the Axe) (season 1 episode 24): Moth
1966: Occasional Wife: Occasional Trouble (Season 1 Episode 2): Miss Wilson
1966: Occasional Wife: Peter by Moonlight (season 1 episode 15): Miss Wilson
1967: Occasional Wife: Alias Peter Patterson (season 1 episode 16): Miss Wilson
1967: Bewitched: Greeting Trap (Three Wishes) (Season 3 episode 22): Buffy
1967: The Green Hornet: The Abominable Dr. Maboul - part 1 (Invasion from Outer Space - Part 1) (Season 1 Episode 25): Vama
1967: The Green Hornet: The Abominable Dr. Maboul - part 2 (Invasion from Outer Space - Part 2) (Season 1 Episode 26): Vama
1967: Hey, Landlord: Who Came to Dinner The Man (Season 1 Episode 30): Julie
1967: Lost in Space: Collision of the Planets (Season 3 Episode 9): Alien Girl
1971: Bonanza: Another Ben (A Deck Of Aces) (Season 12 Episode 18): Dixie Wells
1972: Love, American Style: Love and the Woman in White (Season 4 Episode 11): Veronica La Rue
1975: Columbo'': Forgotten Lady (Season 5 Episode 1): Alma

TV Movies 
 1972: Rolling Man by Peter Hyams, as Crystal
 1973: Old Faithful by Jørn Winther: Councilman Herbert Zucker

References

External links 
 Linda Gaye Scott Official Website
 
 Linda Gaye Scott at Discogs
 https://rss.com/podcasts/lindagayescott/

Further reading 
 

1943 births
Living people
American television actresses
20th-century American actresses
21st-century American women